
Year 1522 (MDXXII) was a common year starting on Wednesday (link will display the full calendar) of the Julian calendar, the 1522nd year of the Common Era (CE) and Anno Domini (AD) designations, the 522nd year of the 2nd millennium, the 22nd year of the 16th century, and the 3rd year of the 1520s decade.

Events 

 January–June 
 January 9 – Pope Adrian VI (born Adriaan Florenszoon Boeyens, Dedens or Dedel; Hadrianus in Latin) succeeds Pope Leo X, as the 218th pope. The only Dutch pope, he will be the last non-Italian elected for more than 450 years.
 January 26 – Spanish conquistador Gil González Dávila sets out from the gulf of Panama to explore the Pacific coast of Central America. He explores Nicaragua and names Costa Rica when he finds copious quantities of gold in Pacific beaches.
 April 27 – Battle of Bicocca: French and Swiss forces under Odet de Lautrec are defeated by the Spanish in their attempt to retake Milan, and are forced to withdraw into Venetian territory.
 May – England presents an ultimatum to France  and Scotland.
 June 19 – Charles V, Holy Roman Emperor visits King Henry VIII of England, and signs the Treaty of Windsor, pledging a joint invasion of France, bringing England into the Italian War of 1521–1526.

 July–December 
 July – The English army attacks Brittany and Picardy from Calais, burning and looting the countryside.
 July 28 – Ottoman Sultan Suleiman I begins his siege to expel the Knights of St. John in Rhodes.
 August – The Knights' Revolt erupts in Germany.
 September 6 – The Victoria (nao Vittoria), one of the surviving ships of the Magellan expedition, returns to Sanlúcar de Barrameda in Spain, under the command of Juan Sebastián Elcano, becoming the first ship to circumnavigate the world.
 September 21 – Luther Bible: Martin Luther's translation of the Bible's New Testament into Early New High German from Greek, Das newe Testament Deutzsch, is published in Germany, selling thousands in the first few weeks.
 September 22 – 1522 Almería earthquake: A major 6.8 to 7.0  earthquake occurs in the capital of Almeria and the Andarax Valley, near Alhama de Almería. It has a maximum felt intensity of X–XI (extreme), and kills about 2,500 people, making it the most destructive earthquake in Spanish history. The city of Almería is totally destroyed, and there is serious destruction in 80 other towns; in Granada, large cracks are observed in various walls and towers.
 October 21–22 – The 1522 Vila Franca earthquake takes place in the municipality of Vila Franca do Campo, at this time the provincial capital, located on São Miguel Island, in the Portuguese archipelago of the Azores.
 November – The Diet of Nuremberg opens.
 December 18 – The Ottomans finally break into Rhodes, but the Knights continue fierce resistance in the streets.
 December 20 – Suleiman the Magnificent accepts the surrender of the surviving Knights in Rhodes, who are allowed to evacuate. They eventually re-settle on Malta, and become known as the Knights of Malta.

 Date unknown 
 The third edition of Erasmus's Greek Textus Receptus of the New Testament, Novum Testamentum (with parallel Latin text), is published in Basel.
 Chinese Ming dynasty War Ministry official He Ru is the first to acquire the Portuguese breech-loading culverin, while copies of them are made by two Westernized Chinese at Beijing, Yang San (Pedro Yang) and Dai Ming.
 Australia is sighted by a Portuguese expedition led by Cristóvão de Mendonça, who maps the continent and names it Jave la Grande ("The Greater Java"), according to the theory of the Portuguese discovery of Australia.
 The Portuguese ally with the Sultanate of Ternate and begin the construction of Fort Kastela.
 The Portuguese, allied with King Ilato of the Goratalo kingdom, construct the Otanaha Fortress.

Births 

 January 22 – Charles II de Valois, Duke of Orléans, (d. 1545)
 February 2 
 Lodovico Ferrari, Italian mathematician (d. 1565)
 Francesco Alciati, Italian Catholic cardinal (d. 1580)
 March 10 – Miyoshi Nagayoshi, Japanese samurai and daimyō (d. 1564)
 March 22 – Daniel Brendel von Homburg, Roman Catholic archbishop (d. 1582)
 March 28 – Albert Alcibiades, German prince (d. 1557)
 April 23 – Catherine of Ricci, Italian prioress (d. 1590)
 May 24 – John Jewel, English bishop (d. 1571)
 June 1 – Dirck Volckertszoon Coornhert, Dutch writer and scholar (d. 1590)
 July 5 – Margaret of Austria, regent of the Netherlands (d. 1586)
 July 13 – Sophia Jagiellon, Duchess of Brunswick-Lüneburg (d. 1575)
 July 25 – Anna of Lorraine (d. 1568)
 July 31 – Charles II de Croÿ, Belgian duke (d. 1551)
 August 4 – Udai Singh II, King of Mewar (d. 1572)
 August 28 – Severinus of Saxony, Prince of Saxony; died young (d. 1533)
 September 11 – Ulisse Aldrovandi, Italian naturalist (d. 1605)
 October 4 – Gabriele Paleotti, Italian Catholic cardinal (d. 1597)
 October 14 – Lucas Maius, Lutheran Reformation pastor, theologian and playwright (d. 1598)
 November 1 – Andrew Corbet, English landowner and politician (d. 1578)
 November 4 – Albert de Gondi, Marshal of France (d. 1602)
 November 9 – Martin Chemnitz, Lutheran reformer (d. 1586)
 November 18 – Lamoral, Count of Egmont, Flemish general and statesman (d. 1568)
 December 16 – Honoré I, Lord of Monaco (d. 1581)
 date unknown
 Mihrimah Sultan, Ottoman princess (d. 1578)
 Moses ben Jacob Cordovero, Spanish Jewish rabbi and kabbalist (d. 1570)
 Philothei, Greek saint (d. 1589)
 Jacques Cujas, French legal expert (d. 1590)
 probable
 Emperor Gelawdewos of Ethiopia (d. 1559)
 possible
 Catherine Howard, fifth queen of Henry VIII of England, (b. between 1518 and 1524; d. 1542)

Deaths 

 January 25 – Raffaello Maffei, Italian theologian (b. 1451)
 January 29 – Wolfgang I of Oettingen, German count (b. 1455)
 February 25 – William Lilye, English classical scholar (b. c. 1468)
 April – Queen Eleni of Ethiopia
 April 10 – Francesco Cattani da Diacceto, Italian philosopher (b. 1466)
 June 13 – Piero Soderini, Florentine statesman (b. 1450)
 June 24 – Elisabeth of the Palatinate, Landgravine of Hesse, German noble (b. 1483)
 June 25 – Franchinus Gaffurius, Italian composer (b. 1451)
 June 30 – Johann Reuchlin, German humanist and Hebrew scholar (b. 1455)
August 28- Giovanni Antonio Amadeo, sculptor, engineer and architect
 September – Gavin Douglas, Scottish poet and bishop (b. c. 1474)
 October 30 – Jean Mouton, French composer (b. c. 1459)
 November 14 – Anne of France, Princess and Regent of France (b. 1461)
 date unknown – Fiorenzo di Lorenzo, Italian painter (b. 1440)

References